Suzanne Rogers (born Suzanne Cecelia Crumpler; July 9, 1943) is an American actress with film and television credits. Her stage name was inspired by Ginger Rogers, whom she cites as a personal inspiration for joining the entertainment industry.  Rogers got her start as a dancer/performer at New York City's Radio City Music Hall, but she is best known for playing Maggie Horton, a role she originated and has played since 1973 on the NBC dramatic serial Days of Our Lives.

Early years
Suzanne Rogers was born Suzanne Cecelia Crumpler on July 9, 1943, in Midland, Maryland. While growing up in Colonial Heights, Virginia, she took an interest in dancing. She expressed interest in it at the age of two and started taking dancing lessons during her childhood.

Career
At the age of 17, Rogers left her hometown and decided to pursue a dancing career. She moved to New York City and became one of the dancers at the Radio City Music Hall. Along with becoming a Rockette, Rogers performed in several Broadway musicals including Coco, Hallelujah Baby and Follies, distinctly heard on the original cast album and mentioned in the book Everything Was Possible which covered the creation and history of the hit Broadway show. After spending 10 years in New York City, the actress wanted to try out an acting dream and moved to California in January 1973.

She attended acting classes in California with Stella Adler at the Stella Adler Studio of Acting. Soon after, she landed the role of Maggie Horton on NBC's Days of Our Lives. Maggie was introduced as a guest character in August 1973, by scriptwriter William J. Bell and executive producer Betty Corday. From the beginning, Bell considered the role ideal for her. He approached Rogers about taking the role of Maggie, and she agreed. She was immediately described by critics who gave reviews of the show as being one of the most energetic girls on daytime television. The news of Rogers being cast as Maggie was a different move, taking an actress who loves to dance, to a character of a crippled farm girl. This was her first television assignment, after being the youngest girl to take the stage at Radio City Music Hall.

In 1984, Rogers was diagnosed with the rare muscle disorder myasthenia gravis. This disease affected her facial muscles, and the medicine the doctors put her on made her feel ill, and her face appeared swollen while also suffering hair loss. She temporarily left the show after 11 years when the effects of the disease became increasingly worse.

Her entire appearance changed, and she did not return to Days of Our Lives for a year. Rogers returned to the serial when her health became better. Rogers, wanting to educate viewers about the disease, encouraged executive producer Betty Corday to have her character be diagnosed with the disease. Corday agreed, and a storyline played out with Maggie learning she has myasthenia gravis. The actress went into remission in 1995, and has remained in remission since. In 2010, after her character's husband is killed off, Maggie began to notice some effects she experienced when diagnosed with the disease in 1984.

In 2003, a major series of serial killings occurred on the show. Maggie was "killed off" in a "whodunnit?" murder storyline involving a serial killer. Maggie's murder forced Rogers to depart from the series, although she made occasional appearances as Maggie's "spirit", appearing with all of the other victims when the apparent culprit, Marlena Evans, attacked Alice. To help with falling ratings at the time, current head writer James E. Reilly decided to bring all the characters back from the dead. They all turned up in the fictional town of Melaswen, or New Salem spelled backwards. This storyline sparked major controversy, and proved to be a daring move.

Since the death of original cast member Frances Reid (Alice Horton) in 2010, Rogers has been the longest-running actress to appear continuously on Days of Our Lives as the new Horton family matriarch.

Personal life
Rogers married Sam Groom in 1980. They divorced in 1982. She lives in Studio City, California.

Filmography

Awards and nominations

References

External links
 
 NBC Daytime-DOOL: Suzanne Rogers profile, nbc.com
 Suzanne Rogers images, Bing.com

1943 births
Living people
20th-century American actresses
Actresses from Los Angeles
American female dancers
American film actresses
American musical theatre actresses
American soap opera actresses
American television actresses
Daytime Emmy Award winners
Daytime Emmy Award for Outstanding Supporting Actress in a Drama Series winners
People from Studio City, Los Angeles
The Rockettes